Redange or Redange-sur-Attert is a commune and town in northwestern Luxembourg, near the border with Belgium. It is the capital of the canton of Redange. Redange is situated on the river Attert, a tributary of the Alzette.

, the town of Redange, which lies in the west of the commune, has a population of 1,099.  Other towns within the commune include Lannen, Nagem, Niederpallen, Ospern, and Reichlange.

People related to Redange 

 Jean-Claude Juncker (*1958), President of the European Commission 2014-2019, born in Redange
 Émile Bian (1873-1918), Member of the Chamber of Deputies 1916-1918, born in Redange
 Léopold Bian (1832-1899), Member of the Chamber of Deputies, Mayor of Redange, died in Redange

Population

References

External links
 

 
Communes in Redange (canton)
Towns in Luxembourg